GLUT5 is a fructose transporter expressed on the apical border of enterocytes in the small intestine. GLUT5 allows for fructose to be transported from the intestinal lumen into the enterocyte by facilitated diffusion due to fructose's high concentration in the intestinal lumen. GLUT5 is also expressed in skeletal muscle, testis, kidney, fat tissue (adipocytes), and brain.

Fructose malabsorption or Dietary Fructose Intolerance is a dietary disability of the small intestine, where the amount of fructose carrier in enterocytes is deficient.

In humans the GLUT5 protein is encoded by the SLC2A5 gene.

Regulation 
Fructose uptake rate by GLUT5 is significantly affected by diabetes mellitus, hypertension, obesity, fructose malabsorption, and inflammation. However, age-related changes in fructose intake capability are not explained by the rate of expression of GLUT5. The absorption of fructose in the simultaneous presence of glucose is improved, while sorbitol is inhibitory. Fructose absorption by GLUT5 can be investigated using intestinal organoids.

Interactive pathway map

References

External links 
 

Solute carrier family